Bruno Monti (12 June 1930 – 16 August 2011) was an Italian road cyclist. As an amateur he won the Piccolo Giro di Lombardia and an Olympic silver medal in the team road race in 1952. In 1953 he turned professional and rode the Giro d'Italia in 1953, 1955–1957 and 1959 and the Tour de France in 1955 and 1956. He won three stages of the Giro, in 1953 and 1957, and placed eighth overall in 1956.

References

External links
 

1930 births
2011 deaths
People from Albano Laziale
Cyclists from Lazio
Italian male cyclists
Olympic cyclists of Italy
Cyclists at the 1952 Summer Olympics
Olympic silver medalists for Italy
Olympic medalists in cycling
Tour de Suisse stage winners
Medalists at the 1952 Summer Olympics
Sportspeople from the Metropolitan City of Rome Capital